CHAB is a Canadian radio station, broadcasting on an assigned frequency of 800 kHz. It is licensed to Moose Jaw, Saskatchewan, and serves the southcentral portion of the province. The station first began broadcasting in 1922 at 1200 AM as 10AB before becoming CHAB on December 17, 1933, before moving to 1220 AM in 1941 and to its current dial position at 800 AM in 1946. The station is currently owned by Golden West Broadcasting which also owns sister stations CJAW-FM and CILG-FM. CHAB's studios are located at 1704 Main Street North in Moose Jaw.

According to CRTC, https://crtc.gc.ca/ownership/eng/cht131.pdf this radio station is not owned by Golden West Broadcasting, but is owned by 101142236 Saskatchewan Ltd, a subsidiary of Elmer Hildebrand Ltd. Elmer Hildebrand Ltd is majority shareholder of Golden West Broadcasting Ltd., but the radio stations under 101142236 Saskatchewan Ltd. are operated separately from Golden West Broadcasting Ltd, just like the radio stations under 629112 Saskatchewan Ltd, which operate under the name Saskatoon Media Group.

CHAB broadcasts with a power of 10,000 watts day and night, with a directional three-tower antenna during nighttime hours and a non-directional antenna during the daytime.

The station was an affiliate of the Canadian Radio Broadcasting Commission from 1933 to 1936 when it affiliated with the newly formed Canadian Broadcasting Corporation. In 1944, it became an affiliate for the CBC's Dominion Network until 1962 when the Dominion Network folded and CHAB became an independent station.

Prior to its current classic hits format, CHAB has been a top 40 station from the early 1960s until the mid-1990s. Although in the late 1980s, the station aired a few classic hits into their playlist, though it continued to air a top 40 station until the mid-1990s. In the mid-1990s, the station switched to a country format station rebranded as Country 800. On July 23, 2002, the station switched to its former oldies format with its current slogan "The Greatest Hits Of All Time". It became a mix of oldies and classic hits station on May 15, 2006.

References

External links
800 CHAB
CHAB history - Canadian Communications Foundation

Hab
Hab
Hab
Radio stations established in 1922
1922 establishments in Saskatchewan
HAB
Canadian Radio Broadcasting Commission